"Soremo kitto shiawase" is the 11th single released by Japanese singer Ami Suzuki under label Avex Trax. It was released on 14 March 2007.

Information
"Soremo kitto shiawase" would be the third of the three collaboration Weekly singles to be released. This will be the first time Ami has collaboration project with Kirinji.

"Soremo kitto shiawase" is a limited-release single.

Track list
 Soremo kitto shiawase    
 Soremo kitto shiawase: Basic Session Version   
 Narration Drama「join」3: The Days After

Charts
Oricon Sales Chart (Japan)

Ami Suzuki songs
2007 singles
2007 songs
Songs written by Ami Suzuki
Avex Trax singles